David Simón Rodríguez Santana (born 16 December 1988), known as David Simón, is a Spanish professional footballer who plays as a right back for Super League Greece club PAS Lamia 1964.

Club career

Las Palmas
Born in Las Palmas, Canary Islands, David Simón started playing as a senior with local CF Unión Viera. In 2010, he moved to UD Las Palmas, being assigned to the reserves in Tercera División.

In the summer of 2011, David Simón was loaned to Segunda División B's UD Vecindario. He featured regularly for the club, which was relegated to the fourth tier.

In June 2012, David Simón renewed his contract with Las Palmas until 2015, but remained with the reserves, however. In August 2014, he was definitely promoted to the main squad.

On 23 August 2014, David Simón played his first match as a professional by starting in a 2–0 home win against UE Llagostera in the Segunda División. He scored his first goal in the competition on 21 March of the following year, but in a 4–2 away loss to CD Numancia.

David Simón was an undisputed starter during the campaign, appearing in 41 games and scoring twice as his team returned to La Liga after a 13-year absence. He made his debut in the competition on 22 August 2015, playing the full 90 minutes in a 1–0 defeat at Atlético Madrid.

Deportivo
On 24 July 2018, after suffering relegation, David Simón terminated his contract with Las Palmas, and signed a two-year deal with fellow second division side Deportivo de La Coruña the following day. He made only ten league appearances in 2019–20 due to a pubis injury, scoring once in an eventual relegation.

Cartagena
David Simón agreed to a one-year contract with FC Cartagena on 2 September 2020.

References

External links

1988 births
Living people
Footballers from Las Palmas
Spanish footballers
Association football defenders
La Liga players
Segunda División players
Segunda División B players
Tercera División players
UD Las Palmas Atlético players
UD Vecindario players
UD Las Palmas players
Deportivo de La Coruña players
FC Cartagena footballers
Super League Greece players
PAS Lamia 1964 players
Spanish expatriate footballers
Expatriate footballers in Greece
Spanish expatriate sportspeople in Greece